The Athlete (Atletu) is a 2009 Ethiopian drama film directed by Davey Frankel and Rasselas Lakew. The film was selected as the Ethiopian entry for the Best Foreign Language Film at the 83rd Academy Awards, but it did not make the final shortlist. It was the first Ethiopian film to be submitted in the category for Best Foreign Language Film. The film has been reviewed in an international journal.

A mixture of fiction and stock footage, The Athlete is a portrait of the marathon runner from Ethiopia, Abebe Bikila. In 1960, he participated in the Rome Olympic Games as a complete unknown. However, the son of a shepherd ran barefoot and won the gold medal. Four years later, he repeated his feat at the Tokyo Olympic Games, becoming the first man to win the Olympic marathon twice in a row. A few years later, he suffered a car accident and lost the use of his legs. He died four years later.

Cast
 Rasselas Lakew as Abebe Bikila
 Dag Malmberg as Onni
 Ruta Gedmintas as Charlotte
 Abba Waka Dessalegn as The Priest

See also
 List of submissions to the 83rd Academy Awards for Best Foreign Language Film
 List of Ethiopian submissions for the Academy Award for Best Foreign Language Film
 Athletics at the 1960 Summer Olympics – Men's marathon

References

External links
 
 
 

2009 films
2009 drama films
2009 biographical drama films
Amharic-language films
Oromo-language films
English-language Ethiopian films
Running films
Films about the 1960 Summer Olympics
Films about the 1964 Summer Olympics
Films about Olympic track and field
Films shot in Bulgaria
Films shot in Norway
Films set in 1969
Films set in Ethiopia
Biographical films about sportspeople
Cultural depictions of Ethiopian people
Cultural depictions of track and field athletes